Ulvåkers IF is a Swedish football club located in Skövde in Skövde Municipality, Västra Götaland County.

Background
Ulvåkers Idrottsförening is a sports club located in Skövde that was formed in 1946. Their main local rivals in the town are Skövde AIK and IFK Skövde.

Since their foundation Ulvåkers IF has participated mainly in the middle and lower divisions of the Swedish football league system.  The club in 2010 have competed in Division 3 Mellersta Götaland which is the fifth tier of Swedish football but have been relegated following the Relegation/Promotion Playoffs. Their place in Division 3 has been taken by IFK Skövde FK who won the playoff group. They play their home matches at the Åbrovallen in Skövde. A huge project for the club was the official opening of Ulvåker IF's new indoor hall on 25 November 2000.  This complex is the first football hall in the Municipality of Skövde.

Ulvåkers IF are affiliated to the Västergötlands Fotbollförbund.

Season to season

Attendances

In recent seasons Ulvåkers IF have had the following average attendances:

Footnotes

External links
 Ulvåkers IF – Official website
 Ulvåkers IF Facebook

Football clubs in Västra Götaland County
Association football clubs established in 1946
1946 establishments in Sweden